The Men's all events team event at the 2010 South American Games was the sum of the four previous competitions.

Medalists

Results

References
Report

Overall Team